The 1917 Washington Senators won 74 games, lost 79, and finished in fifth place in the American League. They were managed by Clark Griffith and played home games at National Park.

The Senators this season hit only four home runs for the entire campaign, second only to the  Chicago White Sox in the modern era, who hit three. First baseman Joe Judge accounted for 50% of them, with two home runs for the season.

Regular season

Season standings

Record vs. opponents

Roster

Player stats

Batting

Starters by position 
Note: Pos = Position; G = Games played; AB = At bats; H = Hits; Avg. = Batting average; HR = Home runs; RBI = Runs batted in

Other batters 
Note: G = Games played; AB = At bats; H = Hits; Avg. = Batting average; HR = Home runs; RBI = Runs batted in

Pitching

Starting pitchers 
Note: G = Games pitched; IP = Innings pitched; W = Wins; L = Losses; ERA = Earned run average; SO = Strikeouts

Other pitchers 
Note: G = Games pitched; IP = Innings pitched; W = Wins; L = Losses; ERA = Earned run average; SO = Strikeouts

Relief pitchers 
Note: G = Games pitched; W = Wins; L = Losses; SV = Saves; ERA = Earned run average; SO = Strikeouts

References 
1917 Washington Senators at Baseball-Reference
1917 Washington Senators team page at www.baseball-almanac.com

Minnesota Twins seasons
Washington Senators season
Washington